The Gandhi Memorial College Srinagar, is a University Grants Commission co-educational college located on 1.75 (14 kanal) acre campus in Shamswari, Fateh Kadal, Srinagar in the Indian union territory of Jammu and Kashmir. The college was established in the year 1942. It is a grant-in-aid college and is run by Hindu Education Society of Kashmir. The college gets grant-in-aid from Govt. of Jammu and Kashmir. It is affiliated with the University of Kashmir.

Location 
Gandhi Memorial College is located in Shamswari, Fateh Kadal locality of Srinagar. It is situated on the bank of river Jehlum near the Mangleshwar Temple.

Establishment 
The college was established by eminent philanthropic personalities of Kashmiri Pandit Community, Hindu Society of Kashmir in 1943, during the regime of Maharaja Hari Singh, to cater to the educational needs of the society.

Degrees offered 
 Bachelor of Arts
 Bachelor of Science
 Bachelor of Commerce
 Bachelor of Business Administration

Awards and achievements 
Gandhi Memorial College has won sixth Inter College Prof. Yousuf Memorial Cricket Championship, Inter College Football Championship (boys), Inter College Judo Championship (boys) .

See also 
Islamia College of Science and Commerce, Srinagar

References 

Website:- http://www.gandhicollegesrinagar.in
Degree colleges in Kashmir Division
Education in Srinagar
Educational institutions established in 1942
1942 establishments in India